Wahibre Ibiau (throne name: Wahibre; birth name: Ibiau, also Ibiaw, Iaib, or Ia-ib) was an ancient Egyptian pharaoh of the 13th Dynasty, who reigned  c. 1670 BC for 10 years 8 months and 29 days according to the Turin King List.

Attestations 
Despite a relatively long reign for the period, Wahibre Ibiau is known from only a few objects, mostly scarab seals bearing his name. He is also named on the stela of an official named Sahathor, probably from Thebes. Finally, a fragment of faience from El-Lahun mentions this king.

A notable member of Ibiau's royal court was the namesake vizier Ibiau. It has been suggested that this vizier could have been the same person as the pharaoh Ibiau earlier in his life, but in more recent times it was pointed out that such an identification is conjectural and unproven.

See also 
 List of pharaohs

References

Bibliography

 K. S. B. Ryholt, The Political Situation in Egypt during the Second Intermediate Period (Carsten Niebuhr Institute Publications, c. 1800–1550 BC, vol. 20. Copenhagen: Museum Tusculanum Press, 1997), 353–54, File 13/32.

17th-century BC Pharaohs
Pharaohs of the Thirteenth Dynasty of Egypt